Carleton Putnam (December 19, 1901 – March 5, 1998) was an American businessman and writer who was an advocate for racial segregation. He graduated from Princeton University in 1924 and received a Bachelor of Laws (LL.B.) from Columbia Law School in 1932. He founded Chicago & Southern Airlines in 1933 which, in 1953, merged with Delta Air Lines. Putnam later served as chief executive officer of Delta Air Lines and held a seat on its board of directors until his death.

Life and career 
Putnam was born to a prominent family from New England, his mother Louise Carleton Putnam, was the daughter of New York publishing magnate George W. Carleton. Paternally, he was a lineal descendant of American Revolutionary War general Israel Putnam. He was also related to the physical anthropologist Carleton Coon, with whom he corresponded closely regarding theories of anatomical and biological differences between human races. He was raised as part of the American Episcopal Church and remained a lifelong member.

His best known book is entitled Race and Reason: A Yankee View (1961), an advocacy of racial segregation that originated in a letter he wrote to President Dwight Eisenhower protesting the end of segregation in U.S. public schools. According to Putnam, the immediate impetus for his letter to Eisenhower was the concurring opinion of Justice Frankfurter in Cooper v. Aaron, 358 U.S. 1 (1958), which Putnam refers to as "the recent Little Rock case". Elsewhere in the book Putnam critiques Brown v. Board of Education, 347 U.S. 483 (1954), calling for its reversal.

Psychologist Henry Garrett wrote the introduction.
In this book, Putnam wrote:
In the next 500,000,000,000 years I would be quite prepared to concede the possibility the Negro may, through normal processes of mutation and natural selection within his own race, eventually overtake and even surpass the white race. [...] When the Negro has bred out his limitations over hundreds, or thousands, of years, it will be time enough to consider absorbing him in any such massive doses as would be involved in the South today. 

The mulatto who was bent on making the nation mulatto was the real danger. His alliance with the white equalitarian often combined men who had nothing in common save a belief that they had a grudge against society. They regarded every Southerner who sensed the genetic truth as a bigot [...]. Here were the men who needed to be reminded of the debt the Negro owed to white civilization.

After Race and Reason: A Yankee View was made required reading for high school students in Louisiana, the American Association of Physical Anthropologists (AAPA) passed a resolution condemning it. Louisiana-born Neo-Nazi, Ku Klux Klan leader and former politician David Duke has cited that reading Race and Reason in when he was a teenager in 1964 and taking in the assertions in the book led to what Duke called his "enlightenment", this book and what it purported convinced Duke that blacks were inferior to whites and that whites were superior to them in every way, leading to a racist worldview. Ultimately, it was Putnam's Race and Reason book that changed David Duke's life and led him to a lifetime of racism and by 1999, Duke was the most famous racist in the United States.

Putnam also wrote a biographical book on Theodore Roosevelt's youth that was praised by Edmund Morris, the author of the best known biography of that president. Putnam admired Roosevelt's belief that "Teutonic (and) English blood is the source of American greatness".

Carleton Putnam died of pneumonia on March 5, 1998. He was survived by his wife, Esther Mackenzie Willcox Auchincloss, a daughter, three grandchildren, a stepdaughter, and three step-grandchildren. He was previously married to Lucy Chapman Putnam.

References

Works
 High Journey: A Decade in the Pilgrimage of an Air Line Pioneer (New York: Charles Scribner's Sons, 1945.)
 Theodore Roosevelt: A Biography. Volume One, The Formative Years, 1858-1886. (New York: Charles Scribner's Sons, 1958.)
 Race and Reason: A Yankee View (Washington D.C.: Public Affairs Press, 1961.)
 Framework for Love, A Study in Racial Realities: Address at the University of California at Davis with Subsequent Questions and Answers (Washington D.C.: National Putnam Letters Committee, 1964.)
 Race and Reality: A Search for Solutions (Washington D.C.: Public Affairs Press, 1967.)

Further reading

External links
Princeton Alumni Weekly Memorials: Carleton Putnam '24
Race and Reason: A Yankee View
Race and Reality: A Search for Solutions
Speech by Carleton Putnam, 26 October 1961

1901 births
1998 deaths
20th-century American biographers
20th-century American businesspeople
20th-century American male writers
American airline chief executives
American male non-fiction writers
American political writers
American segregationists
American white supremacists
Businesspeople from New York City
Race and intelligence controversy
Proponents of scientific racism
Writers from New York City
Deaths from pneumonia in Virginia
Columbia Law School alumni
20th-century American Episcopalians